The Youngstown State Penguins men's basketball team represents Youngstown State University in Youngstown, Ohio. The team currently competes in National Collegiate Athletic Association (NCAA) at the Division I level as a member of the Horizon League, of which it has been a member since 2001. Since 1972, home games are played at the 6,300-seat Beeghly Center on the YSU campus.

History
The team was founded in 1927 and played their first game on December 14, 1927, a 53–24 loss to Thiel College. Like many other men's athletic programs, after the 1942–43 season, the program was suspended, but returned in 1946 after World War II. Upon reinstatement in 1946, the Penguins joined the National Association of Intercollegiate Athletics (NAIA), where they competed from 1946 to 1960. As NAIA members, the Penguins qualified for the NAIA tournament four times and had an overall record of 5–4 in tournament play, advancing as far as the quarterfinals in 1957 and 1958. YSU joined the NCAA in 1960 and competed at the Division II level from 1960 to 1981, joining the Mid-Continent Conference in 1978. During their tenure in Division II, the Penguins qualified for the NCAA tournament nine times and had an overall record of 8–11 in tournament play, advancing as far as the regional finals in 1972. YSU moved to Division I in 1981 and joined the Ohio Valley Conference, playing in the OVC until 1988. The Penguins competed as an independent from 1988 to 1992, then rejoined the Mid-Continent Conference, which by then had become a Division I conference, where they played until joining the Horizon League in 2001.

YSU made their first appearance and recorded their first win in a Division I postseason tournament by playing in the 2013 CollegeInsider.com Postseason Tournament where they went 1–1. The 2022–23 season saw the program win their first-ever conference championship by winning the Horizon League regular-season title, along with their first appearance in the National Invitation Tournament (NIT).

Postseason results

NCAA Division II tournament results
The Penguins have appeared in the NCAA Division II Tournament nine times. Their combined record is 8–11.

NIT results
The Penguins have appeared in the National Invitation Tournament one time. Their combined record is 0-1.

NAIA tournament results
The Penguins have appeared in the NAIA Tournament four times. Their combined record is 5–4.

CIT results
The Penguins have appeared in one CollegeInsider.com Postseason Tournament (CIT). It was their first Division I postseason tournament appearance in program history. Their record is 1–1. They accepted an invitation to the 2020 CIT, however the tournament was canceled.

The Basketball Classic results
The Penguins have appeared in one of The Basketball Classic Tournaments. It was their third Division I postseason tournament appearance in program history. Their record is 1-1

Year by year results

References

External links